Broad Run High School is a public secondary school in Ashburn, an unincorporated area in Loudoun County, Virginia, United States. Broad Run is part of the Loudoun County Public Schools system (LCPS). It was ranked as the #1 Best Public High School in Loudoun County and the #9 Best Public High School in Virginia by U.S. News in 2020.

Originally a rural school serving all of eastern Loudoun County, the growth of the county's population beginning in the mid-1990s has resulted in systematic reduction of Broad Run's attendance area as it spun off eight of the district's high schools from within its original boundaries. Initial surroundings of farm fields have been replaced by housing tracts and the school now possesses one of the most culturally diverse student populations in the region. Broad Run High School is also located in one of the most affluent zip codes and counties in the country with recorded median income of more than $100,000 per household. After a period of high construction in the early 2000s, the number of high schools in the area stayed the same until Briar Woods and Freedom High School opened in 2005, John Champe High school in 2012, Rock Ridge High School in 2014, and Riverside High School completed construction in 2015.

In 1969, Loudoun County opened its third public high school amidst corn fields in Ashburn to accommodate the growing student populations resulting from new housing developments in the unincorporated communities in the eastern half of the county. Since then, the county population has increased nearly sevenfold (most of it in the east), straining education budgets, infrastructure, and local politics. For Ashburn, this has resulted in constantly shifting attendance boundaries as new schools are constantly being opened, at all levels, elementary, middle, and high. The area's student demographics have significantly changed as well: Loudoun County's residents are now the country's most affluent (per capita), and its ethnic composition continues to diversify as foreign immigration into Northern Virginia increases.

Before the 2011–2012 school year, additional lockers were installed due to increases in the school's population.

History
Public education in Ashburn predates Broad Run's debut in 1969. In 1892, a school for Black Americans was built in Old Ashburn. At a cost of $6,000, a separate school, known as Ashburn High School, was built for both elementary and high school white students in 1911. It was a four-room wood-frame schoolhouse; additions to the original structure were made in 1922, 1930, and 1934. The school served white Ashburn students until February 14, 1944, when the entire building was destroyed by fire. Its replacement, an elementary-only brick structure, was constructed in 1945 and is still in use. Known as the Ashburn Annex, it is a training center for LCPS and has also been used for Broad Run High School population overflow.

In the 1960s high school age children from eastern Loudoun County attended Loudoun County High School. As Dulles Airport and residential developments, such as Sterling Park, opened close to the Fairfax County border, Loudoun County High School's population began to outgrow the facility. The decision to construct a high school in rural eastern Loudoun County was made. The strain on Loudoun County High School, however, was so severe that its eastern Loudoun students were temporarily schooled in the then-recently closed Douglass High School in Leesburg. Thus, the first Broad Run High School class actually formed in 1968, a full year before the Broad Run Ashburn campus construction was completed. 1968 had been the first year that the county schools were completely racially integrated, making the previously all-black Douglass High School available as it closed and its population moved to other county schools.

The campus of the district's third high school (Loudoun County High opened in 1954 and Loudoun Valley High School opened in 1962), opened its doors in 1969 to grades 8–12, for students from all of Ashburn, Arcola, western Chantilly (now known as South Riding), and Sterling. Named for the nearby Potomac River tributary, Broad Run was dedicated on October 13, 1969. The ceremony's keynote address was delivered by then-Governor of Virginia, Mills E. Godwin Jr. At the time, Loudoun's three high schools were not limited to 9th through 12th grades since there were no middle schools. Broad Run, therefore, had a "Thetamen" class for two years, its name for eighth graders (similar to calling ninth graders "Freshmen"). In 1976 a portion of the Sterling student body was moved to Park View High School. By 1979 the Thetamen were shifted to newly opened middle schools. As the Ashburn area grew considerably, additional students shifted to Potomac Falls High School in 1997. Stone Bridge High School opened in 2000, which split the Ashburn student body into two different high schools. Broad Run gave the remainder of its Sterling student population to Potomac Falls after Dominion High School opened in 2003 and shifted students in Brambleton and Arcola to Stone Bridge. In 2005, Broad Run split off its South Riding students to Freedom High School. And Stone Bridge split the students that lived in Brambleton and Broadlands to Briar Woods High School. . In 2014, Broad Run moved some of its students in the Ryan Park area to Rock Ridge High School. In 2015, Broad Run shifted students who live in University Center and Potomac Farms to Riverside High School in Lansdowne in order to relieve overcrowding. In addition to this, Broad Run also transferred students living in Ashburn Run, Timberbrooke Estates, The Ridges at Ashburn, and many other subdivisions located off of Ashburn Road to Stone Bridge.

Enrollment history
Broad Run's student population averaged 1,486 students during the period 1995–2006. The county's steady population increases during this time resulted in accompanying student body expansions, periodically relieved as other high schools opened in eastern Loudoun County (note the population drops in the table below as these schools opened – Potomac Falls in 1997, Stone Bridge in 2000, Dominion in 2003, Freedom in 2005, and Riverside in 2015).

*includes an eighth grade class of 244 students

2021 sexual assault

On May 28, 2021, a male teenager was accused of sexually assaulting a female student in a girls' restroom at Stone Bridge High School in Ashburn. Following a weeks-long investigation by the Loudoun County Sheriff's Office, a 14-year-old male was arrested on July 8, 2021, and charged with two counts of forcible sodomy. On October 6, 2021, the same male teenager, now aged 15, was accused of sexually assaulting a female student in an empty classroom at Broad Run High School. The male student was arrested the following day and charged with sexual battery and abduction of a fellow student. On October 25, 2021, the suspect was found guilty on all charges for the May 28 assault. On November 15, 2021, the suspect pleaded no contest to a felony charge of abduction and a misdemeanor count of sexual battery for the October 6 assault. In January 2022, the suspect was found guilty on all four charges and was sentenced to complete a "residential program in a locked-down facility" and placed on supervised probation until he turned 18, and ordered to register as a sex offender in Virginia. Later that month, Brooks decided against placing the perpetrator on the sex offender registry, due to the offender's young age and data indicating that teenagers placed on the registry go on to have higher recidivism rates.

Campus
The campus sits on  along Ashburn Road, across from the Ashbriar community. It has been renovated and expanded many times since its opening in 1969 and is located ½-mile south of Farmwell Road and one mile (1.6 km) north of the Dulles Greenway. The main building houses 75–80 classrooms, three computer labs, a media center (library), auditorium, cafeteria, school store, weight room, and two gymnasiums. The grounds include a sports stadium for football, track and field, lacrosse, and soccer; a baseball diamond; a softball diamond; six tennis courts; a concession stand; practice fields for lacrosse and football; and a pre-school playground.

Students

The Broad Run attendance boundaries encompass the Ashburn communities of Ashburn Village, Farmwell Hunt, One Loudoun, as well as the Ashbrook residential subdivisions. The LCPS middle school Farmwell Station and, by extension, the elementary schools Ashburn, Discovery, and Dominion Trail feed students to the high school. Students living in neighboring communities outside the current attendance boundary, such as Ashburn Farm and Brambleton, have attended in previous years as a result of frequent boundary changes and the school board's policy of "grandfathering" students.

The ethnic/racial composition of Broad Run's student body in the 2006–2007 school year was 64% White, 11% Black, 11% Hispanic, and 14% Asian.

Administration and faculty
The school's administrative team is headed by the principal and includes three assistant principals, the director of guidance, and the athletic director. The principal and school, as part of LCPS, are under the direction of the Superintendent, who operates under the authority of the elected Loudoun County School Board.

Broad Run has had only five principals since it opened: James C. McBride (1969–1979); E. Wayne Griffith (1979–1996); Edgar T. Markley, Ed.D. (1996–2010), Doug Anderson (2010–2014), and David Spage (2014–present). Its principal before Doug Anderson, Edgar T. Markley, a 2003 recipient of The Washington Post's Annual Distinguished Educational Leadership Award, retired after the 2009–2010 school year.

There are 117 teachers, yielding a teacher/student ratio of 1:14.

Administrator timeline

Curriculum

Students mainly attend classes on the Broad Run campus, but have opportunities to take additional, specialized courses at LCPS's magnet and alternative schools, such as science and math at Loudoun Academy of Science or vocational education classes at C.S. Monroe Technology Center.

The school's instructional curriculum is set primarily by the LCPS district office based on Virginia Department of Education requirements. Broad Run's curriculum is typical of Virginia and United States secondary schools.

Students attending the Loudoun Academy of Science and Monroe Advanced Technical Academy do so every other class day, taking their non-magnet classes (typically core courses, such as English, social sciences and electives) at Broad Run on the alternate days.

In the fall 2007–spring 2008 school year, AP physics students at Broad Run were credited with the discovery of Asteroid 2007 TW04, which they have officially begun calling "Sparta" in honor of the Broad Run Spartans. The team, led by their AP Physics teacher, was awarded by NASA.

Academic performance and achievement

Accreditation
Broad Run is a fully accredited high school based on the Standards of Learning (SOL) examinations in Virginia. Virginia high schools are considered fully accredited if students achieve pass rates of 70% or above in all four content areas (English, mathematics, history/social sciences, and science) on SOL examinations administered during the previous school year. Broad Run's pass rates for the 2006–2007 SY were: English – 95%; Math – 87%; History – 91%; and Science – 85%.

Broad Run's "Fully Accredited" status extends back a number of years:

SAT scores
The average Scholastic Aptitude Test (SAT) score in 2006 for Broad Run was 1,568 (535 in Math; 525 in Verbal; 508 in Writing). These scores compare favorably to averages for other LCPS high schools, and are significantly better than the average performances of Virginia students and the United States overall.

Performance history for Broad Run students during the span from 2000 to 2006 shows a steady improvement in Math scores (note that the College Board added the Writing component to the examination for the first time in 2006, and the Critical Reading section was previously called Verbal). In 2006 the school was the only Loudoun County high school whose average SAT scores increased from the previous year.

NCLB and Adequate Yearly Progress (AYP)
To meet the requirements of the federal No Child Left Behind Act (NCLB), the state of Virginia utilizes its Standards of Learning (SOL) examinations as its progress measurement tool. NCLB requires states to set annual measurable objectives of proficiency in reading and mathematics, participation in testing, and graduation and attendance. These objectives are in addition to the high standards for learning and achievement required under Virginia's SOL program. Schools and school divisions that meet the annual objectives required by the federal education law are considered to have made adequately yearly progress (AYP) toward the goal of 100 percent proficiency of all students in reading and mathematics by 2014.

Broad Run has maintained Adequate Yearly Progress for the school years 2003–2004 through 2005–2006. The percentage of students passing the English and Math tests at Broad Run averages higher than Loudoun County as a whole, but lags slightly behind in Science by three points.

Extracurricular activities

Athletics

Broad Run is a member of the AA Dulles District of the Region II of the Virginia High School League, and sponsors girls and boys athletic teams in the following sports: baseball, boys and girls basketball, cheerleading, cross-country, football, golf, gymnastics, boys and girls lacrosse, boys and girls soccer, softball, boys and girls tennis, track, swimming, volleyball, and wrestling. The mascot is a Spartan

Softball
The teams of 2000 and 2002 set new state records for various team categories, such as total runs scored in a season, consecutive shutout innings, total strikeouts in a season, and total strikeouts in one game. Christy Anch, pitcher for the Lady Spartans from 1999 to 2002, personally holds 22 individual state records in the Virginia High School League.

The girls soccer, girls lacrosse, girls softball, boys baseball, boys lacrosse, and boys track teams all won their respective district titles in 2007. Broad Run ended up winning the state championship for softball (Group AA), Broad Run's second in the past decade (won in 2000 and played in the championship 2002). Ranked fifth in the nation by USA Today with a 29–0 record, the Lady Spartans defeated New Kent County High School for the championship behind Caitlyn Delahaba's pitching (no-hitter, 12 strikeouts). Delahaba attained 400 strikeouts in 2007, third place in Virginia High School League history for strikeouts in a season.

For the second year in a row, Broad Run's softball team under the leadership of Caitlin Delahaba completed a perfect, undefeated record in softball, winning the state championship and becoming the nation's best high school softball team according to USA today. In addition, Broad Run's softball team has become history's fourth greatest high school softball team with 57 straight game victories.

Football
The football program experienced limited degrees of success between 2000 and 2006, fielding only two teams with winning records (2003 and 2004 / 6–4 records) in that time period. Losing seasons in 2002 and 2005 led to the replacement of Ken Belchik as head coach with Michael Burnett in 2006. The team's record was 5–5 in 2006. In 2007, the Spartans had a perfect 10–0 regular season, winning the district championship, but lost to rival Park View High School in the first playoff round. In 2008, the Spartan football team won the AA Division 4 state championship, with a 14–0 record. In 2009 the team won a second state title against Amherst. Since then, the team has continued to be successful in the regular season and playoffs, but after head coach Michael Burnett left after the 2009 season, (being replaced by an assistant coach from rival Stone Bridge - Matt Griffis) the team has not won another state title.

Swim
While a relatively new sport to the school, the Broad Run swim team has enjoyed much success in recent years. Under the coaching of Beverly Kelley. the men's team didn't lose a single meet from 2007 to 2011, winning 26 consecutive dual meets and 4 consecutive Dulles District titles, along with being Region II runner-up in 2011. In this period, the men's team won a total of 4 Virginia AA state titles, including the 2010 200 Freestyle Relay team of Michael Poltash, Alan Horback, Jacob Leidy, and Mark Sarman winning in a time of 1:29.09 at Old Dominion University in Norfolk.

Feeder Pattern 
for the 2020–2021 school year:

 Farmwell Middle School
 Ashburn Elementary School
 Discovery Elementary School
 Dominion Trail Elementary School

Notable alumni

Taylor Clarke, drafted as a pitcher in the 3rd round of the 2015 MLB Draft by the Arizona Diamondbacks; attended College of Charleston
Alex Field, played football at Virginia, and on the practice squads of the Cleveland Browns and Arizona Cardinals.
Travis Fulgham, professional football player for the Philadelphia Eagles who played college football at Old Dominion
Larry Izzo, football player for the New England Patriots, attended and played football from 1988 to 1990 before moving to Texas; attended Rice University.
Conor Mullee, pitcher with the New York Yankees; attended Saint Peter's University
Patton Oswalt, actor, writer, voiceover artist and comedian: graduated in 1987; attended the College of William and Mary, a member of the Broad Run Speech and Debate team who regularly contributes money to the team
Samson Sergi, professional soccer player for Loudoun United who played college soccer at Xavier

References

Footnotes and citations

Sources

External links

Official Website
Loudoun County Public Schools website
Official Broad Run Athletics Page Powered By GamedayMagazine.com
Broad Run High School Students and Alumni Facebook Group

Public high schools in Virginia
Educational institutions established in 1969
Northern Virginia Scholastic Hockey League teams
Schools in Loudoun County, Virginia
1969 establishments in Virginia